Randu Janmam is a 1978 Indian Malayalam-language film,  directed by Nagavally R. S. Kurup. The film stars M. G. Soman, Ushakumari, Thikkurissy Sukumaran Nair and Veeran. The film has musical score by MG Radhakrishnan.

Cast
M. G. Soman
Ushakumari
Thikkurissy Sukumaran Nair
Veeran
Adoor Bhasi
KPAC Lalitha
Sreelatha

Soundtrack
The music was composed by M. G. Radhakrishnan and the lyrics were written by Kavalam Narayana Panicker.

References

External links
 

1978 films
1970s Malayalam-language films